Following is a list of senators of Haut-Rhin, people who have represented the department of Haut-Rhin in the Senate of France.
The department was annexed to Germany in 1871 after the Franco-Prussian War, returned to France in 1919 by the Treaty of Versailles.

Third Republic

Senators for Haut-Rhin under the French Third Republic were:

 Robert Bourgeois (1920–1935)
 Paul Helmer (1920–1929) died in office 
 Jules Scheurer (1920–1927)
 Sébastien Gegauff (1920–1935) died in office
 Paul Jourdain (1927–1940)
 Joseph Pfleger (1929–1935)
 Médard Brogly (1935–1940)
 Joseph Brom (1935–1940)
 Paul Ostermann (1935–1940)

Fourth Republic

Senators for Haut-Rhin under the French Fourth Republic were:

Fifth Republic 
Senators for Haut-Rhin under the French Fifth Republic:

References

Sources

 
Lists of members of the Senate (France) by department